Doxander campbelli, common name the Campbell's stromb,  is a species of medium-sized sea snail, a marine gastropod mollusk in the family Strombidae, the true conchs.

Distribution

Description

References

Strombidae
Gastropods described in 1834